A person who lives in or comes from Salt Lake City, Utah is known as a Salt Laker. The following list contains well-known current or former Salt Lake City residents.

Born in Salt Lake City
 Art Laboe (1925-2022), American disc jockey, songwriter, record producer, and radio station owner, generally credited with coining the term "Oldies But Goodies".

 Maude Adams (1872–1953), Broadway stage actress noted for her title role in Peter Pan 
 Karl Alvarez (born 1964), musician, Descendents, ALL, The Lemonheads
 Tony Anselmo (born 1960), Disney animator, voice of Donald Duck (1985–present)
 John T. Axton (1870-1934), first Chief of Chaplains of the United States Army 
Lee Barnes (1906–1970), pole vaulter, gold medalist in 1924 Olympics
 Roseanne Barr (born 1952), actress, comedian 
 Bob Bennett (1933-2016), U.S. Senator from Utah, son of Wallace F. Bennett.
 Wallace F. Bennett (1898-1993), U.S. Senator from Utah, father of Bob Bennett.
 Jaime Bergman (born 1975), actress, former Playboy Playmate 
 Wendy Burch (born 1969), KTLA-TV news reporter 
 Nolan Bushnell (born 1943), founder of Atari, game industry pioneer
 Neal Cassady (1926–1968), influencer of the Beat movement 
 Roy Castleton (1885–1967), major league baseball player 
William Henry Chamberlin (1870–1921), philosopher and theologian
Nathan Chen (born 1999), figure skater
 Clayton M. Christensen (1952–2020), professor at Harvard Business School 
 Lee Cowan (born 1965), CBS News correspondent
 Cytherea (born 1981), pornographic actress, born in Salt Lake City and raised in West Valley City 
 Matthew Davis (born 1978), actor 
 Bryan Dechart (born 1987), actor, raised in Novi, Michigan
 Patrick Fugit (born 1982), actor 
 John Fulton (born 1967), writer
 John W. Gallivan, (1915–2012), newspaper publisher 
 Viola Gillette (1871–1956), comic opera singer, contralto
 Faye Gulini (born 1992), professional snowboarder
 W. Dan Hausel (born 1949), hall of fame martial arts grandmaster, geologist, writer 
 William "Big Bill" Haywood (1869–1928), labor leader
 Whitney Wolfe Herd (born 1989), founder of the dating apps Tinder and Bumble
 Derek Hough and Julianne Hough, entertainers  
 Larry Ivie (1936–2014), comic artist and writer
 Steve Konowalchuk (born 1972), NHL player 
 Joi Lansing (1928–1972), actress and singer
 Keith Larsen (1924–2006), actor
 Trevor Lewis (born 1987), NHL player, first Utah-born Stanley Cup champion
 Ted Ligety (born 1984), Professional alpine ski racer, two-time Olympic gold medalist, and entrepreneur
Zach Lund (born 1979), skeleton racer 
 John Calder Mackay (1920–2014), founder of Mackay Homes, known for developing mid-century modern homes 
 Maddox (born 1978), writer
 Daya Mata (1914–2010), President of the Self-Realization Fellowship and Yogada Satsang Society of India
 Mick Morris (born 1978), musician, Eighteen Visions
William Charles Morris (1874–1940), political cartoonist
 Claude Rex Nowell aka Corky King (1944–2008), founder of Summum
 Louis R. Nowell (1915–2000), Los Angeles City Council member, 1963–77 
 Carol Ohmart (1927–2002), actress, Miss Utah 1946 and Miss America finalist
 Ralph Olsen (1924–1994), NFL player
 Tenny Palepoi (born 1990), NFL player
 Philip J. Purcell (born 1943), American businessman 
 Natacha Rambova (1897–1966), costume and set designer, Egyptologist
 Gary Ridgway (born 1949), serial killer
 G. Ott Romney (1892–1973), third football head coach at Brigham Young University
 Milton Romney (1899–1975), college and pro football player, University of Texas basketball coach, cousin of Michigan Gov. George W. Romney
Sky Saxon (1937-2009), founder and frontman to 1960s psychedelic rock group, The Seeds
 Frances Schreuder (1938–2004), American socialite and convicted murderer
 Elizabeth Smart (born 1987), activist 
 Dave Smith (born 1947), former NFL player 
 Oliver G. Snow (1849–1931), politician
 Wallace Thurman (1902–1934), writer 
 Pete Van Valkenburg (born 1950), NFL player 
 Craig Venter (born 1946), geneticist and entrepreneur
 George Von Elm (1901–1961), golfer
Robert Walker (1918–1951), actor, star of Strangers on a Train
 Loretta Young (1913–2000) actress, Academy Award winner

Native born and long-time residents of Salt Lake City
 Linda Bement (1941–2018), Miss Utah USA 1960, Miss USA 1960, Miss Universe 1960
 Frank Borzage (1894–1962), film director 
 Wilford Brimley (1934–2020), character actor
Ralph Vary Chamberlin (1879–1967), biologist, ethnographer and historian
Paul W Draper (born 1978), mentalist and magician
 David C. Evans (1924–1998), pioneer of computer graphics; founder of the computer science department at the University of Utah; co-founder of Evans & Sutherland 
Richard Paul Evans (born 1962), author, best known for the Michael Vey series of books
 Gordon B. Hinckley (1910–2008), president of the Church of Jesus Christ of Latter-day Saints 
 Thomas S. Monson (1927–2017), president of the Church of Jesus Christ of Latter-day Saints 
 Frank Moss (1911–2003), U.S. Senator representing Utah (1959–1977) 
 Kim Peek (1951–2009), savant 
 Vernon B. Romney (1924–2013), Attorney General of Utah 1969–77, gubernatorial candidate
 Ken Sanders (born 1951), antiquarian bookseller
 Charlotte Sheffield (1936–2016), Miss Utah USA 1957, Miss USA 1957 (succeeded)
 Peggy Wallace (1943–2020), Utah state representative
 John Warnock (born 1940), computer scientist and co-founder of Adobe Systems Inc. 
 David Zabriskie (born 1979), professional road bicycle racer

Non-native long-time Salt Lake City residents, present or former
 Maurice Abravanel (1903–1993), influential Utah Symphony conductor 
Darr H. Alkire (1903–1977), Air Force Brigadier General, Stalag Luft III POW
 Heather Armstrong (born 1975), blogger, dooce.com 
 Belladonna (born 1981), pornographic actress
 Jackie Biskupski (born 1966) politician. Mayor of Salt Lake City 2016-2020.
 Alistair Cockburn (born 1966), computer scientist noted for agile software development
 Reed Cowan (born 1972), journalist
 Roma Downey (born 1960), Irish actress, singer, and producer, star of TV series Touched by an Angel 
 Lily Eskelsen García (born 1955), vice-president of the National Education Association 
Brandon Flowers (born 1981), frontman and lead singer to chart topping alternative rock band, The Killers
 Tan France (born 1983), fashion designer, television personality, and author
 Jake Garn (born 1934), U.S. Senator representing Utah (1974–1993) 
Tyler Glenn (born 1983), frontman and lead singer to Provo-based alt pop band, Neon Trees
 Jared Goldberg (born 1991), professional alpine ski racer 
Gregg Hale, former guitarist for the platinum UK band Spiritualized 
 George C. Hatch (1919–2009), cable television pioneer 
 Orrin Hatch (1934–2022), U.S. Senator representing Utah (1977–2019) 
 Ammon Hennacy (1893–1970), anarchist organizer 
 James Irwin (1930–1991), Apollo 15 Lunar Module Pilot 
 Ken Jennings (born 1974), Jeopardy! champion
Cameron Latu 
Karl Malone (born 1963), basketball player for Utah Jazz (1985–2003) 
Post Malone (1995-), Grammy nominated rapper, singer, songwriter, and record producer.
 Lee Mantle (1851–1934), U.S. Senator from Montana
 Robert "Bobby" McFerrin, Jr. (born 1950), vocalist and conductor 
 James Merendino (born 1969), filmmaker, SLC Punk!
 Ritt Momney (born 1999), singer
 Merlin Olsen (1940–2010), NFL player, television commentator, and actor
 Stevie Nicks (born 1948), singer-songwriter, best known for her work with Fleetwood Mac
 Dick Nourse (born 1940), television news anchor (1964–2007) 
 Robert Redford (born 1936), founder of the Sundance Film Festival, Sundance Channel
 Nick Rimando (born 1979), former goalkeeper for Real Salt Lake, won the MVP Award after Real Salt Lake won MLS Cup 2009. Currently works as an academy coach at the Real Monarchs academy in Herriman, Utah
Lenore Romney (1908–1998), former First Lady of Michigan and U.S. Senate candidate, mother of Mitt Romney; raised in Salt Lake City
 Harold Ross (1892–1951), journalist and founder of The New Yorker magazine 
 Karl Rove (born 1950), Deputy Chief of Staff to President George W. Bush 
 Wallace Stegner (1909–1993), Pulitzer Prize-winning novelist and nature writer 
 John Stockton (born 1962), basketball player for Utah Jazz (1984–2003) 
 Ivan Sutherland (born 1938), computer scientist, Internet pioneer and co-founder of Evans & Sutherland 
 Edgar A. Wedgwood (1856–1920), adjutant general of the Utah National Guard
 Brigham Young (1801–1877), founder of Salt Lake City, president of the LDS Church 
 Steve Young (born 1961), NFL quarterback for the San Francisco 49ers and Tampa Bay Buccaneers
W. Mont Ferry (1871 – January 11, 1938) Former Salt Lake City Mayor (1915-1919) and Founder of Anti-Mormon American Party.

References

Salt Lake City
Salt Lake City